Kuliki is a village in Orlovsky District of Oryol Oblast, Russia.

References

Rural localities in Oryol Oblast